Horace Burke (born 1913, date of death unknown), better known under the alias Paddy Mills, was a motorcycle speedway rider whose career spanned World War II.

Born Horace Burke in Leicester in 1913, he adopted the name Paddy Mills and began his career at Leicester in 1937, riding for the Hounds in the Provincial League. In 1938 he joined Sheffield, spending a season there before joining the Royal Air Force. He served in the RAF for six years, and was awarded the British Empire Medal. After the war he joined the Norwich Stars, for whom he was the third highest points scorer in 1946, with 348 points in total. He went on to be the team's leading points scorer in both 1947 and 1948. He was picked to represent England in second test match in 1949, but suffered a fractured skull a few days before.

In 1952 Mills became president of the newly formed Leicester Amateur Speedway Club, which had a training track at Syston. In the late 1960s, Mills ran training sessions for the Long Eaton Archers.

References

1913 births
Year of death missing
British speedway riders
English motorcycle racers
Sportspeople from Leicester
Sheffield Tigers riders
Norwich Stars riders
Stoke Potters riders